Virginia Bell (August 14, 1934 – July 18, 2010) was a topless model and actress.

Early life
Bell was born Virginia Miriam Beck in Montrose, California on August 14, 1934. Her parents were John Charles Beck and Freda Yugend. She graduated high school in 1949. She was married a short time to Charles Merle Bell, and then to Eli Jackson, who would go on to produce some of her earliest movies.

Career

Bell began her career in burlesque at age 22. By the 1950s, Bell began posing for men's magazines.
Virginia had one starring role in a feature film, Bell, Bare and Beautiful (1963), which was the product of legendary sexploitation team of Herschell Gordon Lewis and David Friedman. It was made to fulfill a request by her husband, Eli Jackson. In it, Virginia plays a burlesque dancer pursued by Lewis regular Thomas Wood.  But his attempts at finding true love with the "girl of his dreams" are thwarted by her gangster boyfriend (played by David Friedman).  Wood gets around this speedbump by tracking Virginia down at the nudist camp she frequents, which is where at least half the film takes place.
Virginia would make another appearance in Lullaby of Bareland (1964), a series of three shorter segments spliced together to flesh out the runtime.  Virginia's contribution is a lengthy striptease routine.
Aside from feature films, Virginia appeared in many nudie loops, which can be found in the video series, "Reel Classics", and in the "Big Bust Loops" and "Super Boobs" series from Something Weird Video.
In the early ‘60s, Bell had three children by her husband Jackson: Pierre Joseph Jackson, b. 1961, Tyrone Eli Jackson b.1962 and Todd George Jackson b. 1964. After she and Eli divorced, she was married to Alexander White until his death in 2004.

Later life
Bell retired from adult entertainment in the early ‘70s and lived a quiet life until her death on July 19, 2010.

References

External links

1934 births
2010 deaths
American burlesque performers
People from La Crescenta-Montrose, California
20th-century American actresses
21st-century American women